Christian, Prince of Nassau-Dillenburg (12 August 1688 at Dillenburg Castle – 28 August 1739 in Straßebersbach, now part of Dietzhölztal) was the last ruler (i.e. Fürst) of Nassau-Dillenburg from the line that had started in 1606 with George, Count of Nassau-Dillenburg.

Life 
His parents were Henry, Prince of Nassau-Dillenburg (1641-1701) and his wife Duchess Dorothea Elizabeth of Legnica.

After his parents died, his older brother William II took up Christian's education.  Christian and his Hofmeister, Gustav von Moltke, were sent to Leiden, where Christian enthusiastically studied mathematics at the local university.

In 1708, Christian joined the Dutch army as a major.  On 16 April 1711, he was promoted to colonel.  He fought with distinction in the Dutch against the French during the War of the Spanish Succession.  After the 1713 Treaty of Utrecht, he returned to Germany and resided in Hadamar.  In 1711, Francis Alexander, the last Prince of Nassau-Hadamar had died and his territory had been divided among the surviving Ottonian lines of Nassau: Nassau-Dietz, Nassau-Dillenburg and Nassau-Siegen.

In 1724, his brother William II died without a male heir and Christian inherited Nassau-Dillenburg.

In 1731, Prince Frederick William II of Nassau-Siegen died.  With his death, the Calvinist line of Nassau-Siegen died out.  Initially, the rule of Nassau-Siegen was taken of by Emmanuel Ignaz (1688-1735), a younger half-brother of William Hyacinth, who had been deposed in 1707.  After Emmanuel Ignaz died in 1735, Nassau-Siegen was divided by the remaining Ottonian lines: Nassau-Dietz and Nassau-Dillenburg.  As head of the Ottonian branch, Christian concluded an inheritance treaty in 1736 with Charles August, the head of the Walram line: if one of the line were to die out in the male line, the other line would inherit their possessions.

Prince Christian died of a  attack on 28 August 1739 in Straßebersbach (now part of Dietzhölztal). Since he was childless, Nassau-Dillenburg was divided between William IV of Nassau-Dietz and William Hyacinth of Nassau-Siegen.

Prince Christian was appointed Knight of the Order of Saint Hubert.

Marriage 
In 1725, Christian married Isabella Charlotte, the daughter of Henry Casimir II of Nassau-Dietz.

Ancestors

External links 
 

Christian
Christian
1688 births
1739 deaths
18th-century German people